Rudolf Nováček (7 April 1860 – 11 August 1929) was a Czech composer, military conductor, and pedagogue.

Life and career 
Rudolf Nováček was born to the conductor  and Maria Hildebrand in the village of Bela Crkva (now Serbia). His younger brothers were the musicians Ottokar,  and  who with their father toured as the Nováček Family String Quartet.

Rudolf Nováček studied Timișoara music school and then Conservatory in Vienna. Nováček became conductor of 11th Battalion in Austro-Hungarian Army and then member of 12th Battalion. In 1884 he joined Artistic Organization in Prague along with other significant Czech composers as Antonín Dvořák, Zdeněk Fibich or Karel Bendl.

In 1890 he became bandleader of 1st Cavalry Regiment in Sofia and then from 1891 until 1895 in Romanian Royal Guard in Bucharest. He worked as conductor and music teacher in many cities in Russia, Belgium, Netherlands and Germany.

After creation of Czechoslovakia, he had to become the director of the military school of the Czechoslovak Army. He died in 1929 in Prague on the consequences of an operation.

Major works

Marches 
 Pochod 74. pluku (74er Defilier Marsch)
 Benedek Jubiläums Marsch, 1879
 Defilir-March, op. 25
 Castaldo, op. 40, named after commander of 28th Battalion Ludwig Castaldo (1839–1910), one of the well-known marches in Central Europe
 Náš druhý milion, 1891
 Na zdar naší výstavě
 My plzeňští hoši
 Koridor Marsch
 Pochod generála Laudona (General Laudon Marsch)
 Kde domov můj
 Pozdrav ze Sofie
 Pochod našich hochů
 Kardief
 Pochod ministra Národní obrany
 Na prej
 Ahoj!

Dance music 
 Kouzlo květů, polka francais
 Hygea, polka
 Velebínka, polka
 Ples juristů, polka
 Pohádková kouzla, waltz
 Mezi bratry, polka mazur
 České album taneční, walz

Other compositions 
 Osm pamětních lístků, Op. 1
 Little Suite for Piano (collection Young Czech pianist)
 Sonata for Violin Concert For Violin Romance for Cello and Piano, 1889
 Sinfonietta for Wind Instruments 1888
 Othello'', prelude

References 

1860 births
1929 deaths
19th-century classical composers
20th-century classical composers
19th-century Austrian military personnel
Czech military personnel
Czech classical composers
Czech male classical composers
Czech conductors (music)
Male conductors (music)
Austrian people of Czech descent
Hungarian people of Czech descent
People from Bela Crkva
20th-century conductors (music)
20th-century Czech male musicians
19th-century Czech male musicians